The 2010 Northern Mariana Championship was the fifth season of top-flight football in Northern Marianas Islands. The competition was won Marianas Pacific United.

Participating teams
The following teams participated in the 2010 Northern Mariana Championship:

 Inter Godfather's
 Korean Senior (named Korean FA in the previous season.)
 Korean Junior (named Korean FA Juniors in the previous season.)
 Marianas Pacific United
 Matansa FC
 Tan Holdings FC
 Wild Bill's
 Young Guns (competed in the previous season as Independents and played as an U-18 team in this season.)

Final table
A number of results for the season are not known and no full table is available which includes correct goal difference for any part of the season,

Known results

Beyond the games listed above, the following results, though not scores are known:

 Week 5: Korean Senior beat Matansa and Wild Bill's beat Tan Holdings.
 Week 8: Inter Godfather's beat Matansa and Korean Junior beat Tan Holdings.
 Week 12: Inter Godfather's beat an unknown team, and unknown team beat Young Guns and Korea Juniors achieved a draw at best against unknown opposition.
 Final Round: Only the result between MP United and Young Guns is known.

References

Marianas Soccer League seasons
North
North
football